Five ships of the United States Navy have borne the name USS Hercules, after Hercules, the Roman name version of Heracles. Hercules also is the name of a constellation.

  was a monitor ironclad steamer, originally named Quinsigamond, she was rechristened Hercules from 15 June to 10 August 1869, and then to Oregon
  was a tugboat, purchased by the US Navy in April 1889 for use in the Spanish–American War and sold in 1937
  was a lighter purchased by the US Navy in 1918 and sold in 1923
  was acquired by the US Navy in 1941 and transferred to the Maritime Commission in July 1946

United States Navy ship names